was a Japanese voice actor who was born in Tokyo, Japan.

His name is sometimes misread as Yasurō Tanaka.

Filmography

Television animation
 Android Kikaider (1972) (Gray Rhino King), and (Blue Buffalo)
 Galaxy Express 999 (1979) (Maetel's father, Mayor, Policeman A)
 GeGeGe no Kitaro (1985) (Miagenyuudou, Tantanbou, Uruta, Akane's father, Kamanari, Sakanaya, Nobiagari, Werewolf, Daruma doll, Gasahdokuro, Thief)
 Dragon Ball (1986) (Bacterian, Kinkaku)
 Dragon Ball Z (1990) (Zaacro)
 Street Fighter II V (1995) (Zangief)
 Rurouni Kenshin (1996) (Onisaki Tekkan)

Unknown date
Akuma-kun (Cerberus)
Ai Shite Knight (Doctor, Chief Senden)
Space Battleship Yamato III (Professor Simon)Science Ninja Team Gatchaman (Captain, Captain Shirei)Crayon Shin-chan (Wameo Miki)Kiteretsu Daihyakka (Buta Gorilla's Uncle)Time Bokan (Dracula, Drenson, Professor Griffen)Yatterman (Elder, Donpan)Space Runaway Ideon (Rice)High School! KimengumiFist of the North Star (Mad General, Gojiba, Haystack, Zacol, Gonz, Morgan)Fist of the North Star 2 (Barona, Bron)Yume Senshi Wingman (Rimel)Lupin III Part III (Laselle)

Original video animation
Legend of the Galactic Heroes (1991) (Airanz)

Animated films
Doraemon: Nobita and the Haunts of Evil (1982) (Village headman)
Doraemon: Nobita and the Steel Troops (1986) (Robot Squad Leader)
Ultraman USA (1989) (Professor Filbee)

Video game
Tengai Makyou: Ziria (1989)

Japanese dub
The Blues Brothers (1983 Fuji TV edition) (Curtis (Cab Calloway))
Dracula (1982 TV Asahi edition) (Milo Renfield (Tony Haygarth))
The Muppet Show (Sweetums)

References

External links
 

Japanese male voice actors
1932 births
2003 deaths
Male voice actors from Tokyo